Sylvain Roy is a Canadian politician from Quebec, currently serving as an independent member of the National Assembly of Quebec for Bonaventure electoral district.

He was elected in the 2012 Quebec general election, defeating Liberal incumbent Damien Arsenault.  He had previously lost to Arsenault in a by-election on December 5, 2011.

On June 4, 2021, Roy announced on Twitter that he would leave the Parti Québécois caucus and sit as an independent MNA, citing disagreements regarding the application of Bill 101 in CEGEP along with other issues that deteriorated his trust relationship with his former caucus.

References

External links
 
 Candidate page

1964 births
Independent MNAs in Quebec
Parti Québécois MNAs
Living people
Politicians from Saint John, New Brunswick
21st-century Canadian politicians